The Dallara IR-7, and its evolutions, the Dallara IR-8 and Dallara IR-9, are open-wheel formula racing cars, designed, developed, and produced by Italian manufacturer Dallara for use in the IndyCar one-make spec-series, between 1997 and 1999.

References

External links
Dallara's Official Website

IndyCar Series
Open wheel racing cars
IR-7
American Championship racing cars